Gilson Simões de Souza (born 25 March 1967) is an international footballer who played as a midfielder. He is best known for his spell at Barcelona SC where he was a fan favourite. Born in Brazil, Gilson represented the Ecuador national football team.

Club career
Gilson began his playing career in Brazil where he played for Atlético Paranaense and Vasco da Gama.

International career
He made 17 appearances for the Ecuador national football team from 1996 to 1997.

References

External links

Player profile at BDFA

1967 births
Living people
People from Duque de Caxias, Rio de Janeiro
Ecuadorian footballers
Ecuador international footballers
Brazilian footballers
Brazilian emigrants to Ecuador
Association football midfielders
Americano Futebol Clube players
CR Vasco da Gama players
Louletano D.C. players
Barcelona S.C. footballers
Club Athletico Paranaense players
L.D.U. Quito footballers
Al Hilal SFC players
Al-Ahli Saudi FC players
Al-Rayyan SC players
Saudi Professional League players
Qatar Stars League players
Ecuadorian expatriate footballers
Ecuadorian expatriate sportspeople in Saudi Arabia
Ecuadorian expatriate sportspeople in Qatar
Brazilian expatriate footballers
Brazilian expatriate sportspeople in Saudi Arabia
Brazilian expatriate sportspeople in Qatar
Expatriate footballers in Saudi Arabia
Expatriate footballers in Qatar
Sportspeople from Rio de Janeiro (state)